Răcari may refer to several places in Romania:

Răcari, a town in Dâmbovița County
Răcari (Răcarii de Jos from 1968 to 2017), a village in Brădești, Dolj
Răcarii de Sus, a village in Filiași town, Dolj County